The 1958 football season was São Paulo's 29th season since club's existence.

Overall

{|class="wikitable"
|-
|Games played || 81 (9 Torneio Rio-São Paulo, 38 Campeonato Paulista, 34 Friendly match)
|-
|Games won || 44 (4 Torneio Rio-São Paulo, 25 Campeonato Paulista, 15 Friendly match)
|-
|Games drawn || 20 (2 Torneio Rio-São Paulo, 10 Campeonato Paulista, 8 Friendly match)
|-
|Games lost ||  17 (3 Torneio Rio-São Paulo, 3 Campeonato Paulista, 11 Friendly match)
|-
|Goals scored || 187
|-
|Goals conceded || 106
|-
|Goal difference || +81
|-
|Best result || 6–0 (H) v Guarani - Campeonato Paulista - 1958.08.07
|-
|Worst result || 1–5 (H) v Corinthians - Friendly match - 1958.04.16
|-
|Most appearances || 
|-
|Top scorer || 
|-

Friendlies

Official competitions

Torneio Rio-São Paulo

Record

Campeonato Paulista

Record

External links
official website 

Association football clubs 1958 season
1958
1958 in Brazilian football